Florida Man is an upcoming American streaming television limited series created by Donald Todd, who serves as an executive producer alongside Jason Bateman, Michael Costigan, and Miguel Arteta. It stars Édgar Ramírez as an ex-cop who is sent back to his home state of Florida to solve a case. Anthony LaPaglia, Abbey Lee, Otmara Marrero, Lex Scott Davis, Emory Cohen, and Isaiah Johnson also star in main roles. The series was shot in Wilmington, North Carolina.

Florida Man is scheduled to be released on April 13, 2023 on Netflix.

Premise
Mike Valentine is a struggling ex-cop forced to return to his home state of Florida to find a Philly mobster's runaway girlfriend. What should be a quick gig becomes a spiraling journey into buried family secrets and an increasingly futile attempt to do the right thing.

Cast

Main

 Édgar Ramírez as Mike Valentine
 Anthony LaPaglia as Sonny Valentine, Mike's father
 Abbey Lee as Delly West
 Otmara Marrero as Patsy, Mike's sister
 Lex Scott Davis as Iris, Mike's ex-wife and a detective
 Emory Cohen as Moss Yankov, Mike's boss
 Isaiah Johnson as Benny, a motel owner

Recurring
 Clark Gregg as Deputy Sheriff Ketcher
 Sibongile Mlambo as Clara, Benny's wife
 Paul Schneider as Officer Andy Boone
 Lauren Buglioli as Kaitlin Fox, a news anchor
 Michael Esper
 Leonard Earl Howze as Ray-Ray, a former cop
 Isabel Gameros as Tyler, Patsy and Deacon's 14-year-old daughter
 Mark Jeffrey Miller as Buzz, Sonny Valentine's associate

Episodes

Production

	
In July 2018, Jason Bateman and Michael Costigan's Aggregate Films signed a multi-year production deal with Netflix. The largest partnership in the streamer's history at the time, this deal also served to increase Bateman's collaborations with Netflix after their revival of Arrested Development and the release of Ozark. In a statement, Bateman said the streamer's releases allowed him to avoid worrying about how many people watch his content and said "Netflix is succeeding on the merits and word of mouth and we are excited to bring them stuff."

In April 2021, Netflix announced that it had given an eight-episode series order to Florida Man with Édgar Ramírez attached to star and Aggregate Films set to produce. In August, it was reported that Miguel Arteta, Julian Farino, Haifaa al-Mansour, and Kevin Bray would direct two episodes each. That same month, Anthony LaPaglia, Abbey Lee, Otmara Marrero, Lex Scott Davis, Emory Cohen, Clark Gregg, Isaiah Johnson, Sibongile Mlambo, Paul Schneider, Lauren Buglioli, Michael Esper, Leonard Earl Howze, Isabel Gameros, and Mark Jeffrey Miller joined the cast.

Principal photography began on August 10, 2021, and was scheduled to conclude on November 16. Filming took place in Wilmington and Carolina Beach, North Carolina. After several filming delays, shooting continued in December 2021. The Pointe at Barclay, a shopping complex in Wilmington, was also a filming location. Cargo containers, colorful buildings, and wooden structures were brought to the complex for the shoot. Additional filming locations included Stevens Ace Hardware, UniFirst Uniform Services, Hell's Kitchen, Copper Penny, and Quanto Basta.

The limited series is set to premiere on April 13, 2023 on Netflix, with seven episodes instead of the original eight-episode order.

References

External links
 
 

American detective television series
Television shows filmed in North Carolina
Television shows filmed in Wilmington, North Carolina
Television shows set in Florida
Upcoming Netflix original programming
English-language Netflix original programming